The Ma'ayanot Yeshiva High School is a private Jewish day school for girls in grades nine through twelve, located in Teaneck, in Bergen County, New Jersey, United States, serving the Orthodox communities of Bergen County and neighboring areas. The school has been accredited by the Middle States Association of Colleges and Schools Commission on Elementary and Secondary Schools since 2002 and is accredited through July 2027.

The school was started in 1996 and has the stated aim of inculcating values of Ahavat Torah (love of Torah) and Yirat Shamayim (fear of God). The founding principal was Esther Kraussand the current principal is CB Neugroschl.

As of the 2017–18 school year, the school had an enrollment of 325 students and 41 classroom teachers (on an FTE basis), for a student–teacher ratio of 7.9:1. The school's student body was 100% White.

Notable alumni
Naomi Kutin (born c. 2001), powerlifter who has set numerous records in the sport at several weight classes since starting her career at the age of 8.

References

External links 
 
 Data for Ma'ayanot Yeshiva High School, National Center for Education Statistics
 Ma'ayanot volunteering at the Hebrew Free Burial Association's Silver Lake Cemetery - November 2006

Girls' schools in New Jersey
Jewish day schools in New Jersey
Mesivtas
Middle States Commission on Secondary Schools
Modern Orthodox Jewish day schools in the United States
Modern Orthodox Judaism in New Jersey
Orthodox yeshivas in New Jersey
Private high schools in Bergen County, New Jersey
Teaneck, New Jersey